Herman Branover (born 1931) is a Russian Israeli physicist and Jewish educator. He is best known in the Jewish world as an author, translator, publisher, and educator. Branover is known in the scientific community as a pioneer in the field of magnetohydrodynamics (MHD). In his personal conduct he adheres to the customs and mystical philosophy of Chabad Hasidism.

Biography

Branover was born in Riga, Latvia, into an atheist Jewish family. His father was killed in World War II by the withdrawing Red Army, but his mother managed to escape with him to Russia and survive. He earned his Ph.D. from the Moscow Aviation Institute specializing in magnetohydrodynamics, and completed a D.Sc. degree in physics and mathematics at the Leningrad Polytechnic Institute. Concurrently, he spent a substantial part of his time in the National Library of Russia where he learned Hebrew from whatever books he could find there. After finishing his studies in Saint Petersburg he returned to Riga and started working in several scientific institutions while also making inroads into the Chabad movement. When he had first applied for a permission to immigrate to Israel, he lost his academic job and made his living by selling clothing.

As a young scientist in Riga, Branover wrote philosophical essays questioning atheism, materialism, and determinism and seeking God. He led a fifteen-year struggle to leave the Soviet Union (he was a Refusenik), during which he initiated and directed a great number of activities advancing Jewish education and culture; he was among the initiators of the Jewish revival movement in Soviet Russia. He learned Hebrew secretly at great peril while a student in Leningrad. Frequent arrests, interrogations, and harassment by the KGB did not stop him from teaching Jewish thought and ethics to many individuals and groups. Branover was the first Jew holding a Doctor of Science degree and the title of Full Professor to receive an exit visa to leave the USSR.

In Israel, Branover started a research and development company, Solmecs, which developed a non-conventional environmentally safe energy generator which has led to many spin-off technologies.

In 1987 Branover founded SATEC, which started out as a technological business incubator, soon after focusing on the development and manufacturing of power metering solutions, such as power meters and power quality analyzers. This move was inspired by the Lubavitcher Rebbe, who predicted an influx of Jewish immigration from the Soviet Union, following Perestroika. His aim was to create jobs in a fitting technological environment for these immigrants, many of them holding advanced scientific degrees and in-depth technological experience.

In 1991, the Russian Academy of Natural Sciences invited Branover to supervise its 8-volume Encyclopedia of Russian Jewry. Covering 1000 years, the encyclopedia details the contribution of Jews to Russian and world civilization. The late Sir Isaiah Berlin of Oxford was the first chief consultant of the encyclopedia, and the Israeli Ministry of Education helps support the project. Three volumes have been printed in Russian. An English translation of Volume One was published in 1998 by Jason Aronson Publishers in the U.S., and a children's version is planned.

Branover is president of the SHAMIR Association of Religious Professionals from the USSR and editor-in-chief of its publishing house. The SHAMIR office in Jerusalem runs a free employment placement service for immigrants, which boasts a 20-percent success rate.

Under Branover's direction, SHAMIR established a well-accredited Jewish day school in Saint Petersburg. SHAMIR also has sent Rabbi Natan Barkan to Riga to serve as the Chief Rabbi of Riga and Latvia. Together with Rabbi Barkan and Prof. Ruvin Ferber, Branover has organized four international conferences in Riga entitled “Jews in a Changing World.” This is the only forum in the world where former Soviet Jews discuss spiritual and cultural problems on an academic level. Most of the Russian-speaking participants are successful academics who have never before studied Jewish Mysticism or thought of applying it to their lives.

Works
His early philosophical manuscripts were secretly reproduced and smuggled out of the USSR to Israel and published there in Russian and Hebrew by the Israeli Ministry of Education. 
While in the USSR, Branover undertook to translate some of the fundamental works of Judaism into Russian. He has continued this work in Israel through SHAMIR, where he has organized and trained a team of translators and editors to complete and expand his work, which includes most importantly the Pentateuch with commentaries, the Code of Jewish Law, and writings of Maimonides and Yehuda Halevy. Over 12 million copies of 400 titles of Russian-language Judaica have been published by SHAMIR. 
Branover's autobiography "Return", including De Profundis, a collection of his early philosophical essays has been published in Russian, Spanish, Portuguese, Hebrew and English. 
Branover founded the periodical "B’Or Ha’Torah" in 1981. It was founded at the urging of the late Lubavitcher Rebbe, Menachem Mendel Schneerson, who gave the periodical its name.  The publication allows distinguished scientists – initially those close to the Rebbi –  to bring their discussions of contradictions between Torah and science to a wider audience. Out of its 97 authors, 28 are Chabad Hasidim and 69 are not. Most of the referees are not affiliated with Chabad.

See also
Modern day Orthodox Jewish views on evolution
Prominent Orthodox physicists:
Nathan Aviezer
Cyril Domb
Aryeh Kaplan
Yehuda (Leo) Levi
Alvin Radkowsky
Gerald Schroeder

References

External links and references 
 Profile
 borhatorah.org
 Prof. Branover's writings
 Branover's Biography of the Lubavitcher Rebbe 

Chabad-Lubavitch Hasidim
Latvian Orthodox rabbis
Scientists from Riga
Latvian physicists
Jewish scientists
Jewish physicists
20th-century Latvian inventors
Latvian Jews
Latvian emigrants to Israel
Soviet emigrants to Israel
Refuseniks
Israeli Hasidim
Living people
1931 births
Foreign Members of the Russian Academy of Natural Sciences
Soviet physicists
Israeli physicists
Clergy from Riga